The Italian American War Veterans of the United States (ITAMVETS) is an Italian American veterans organization. The group was granted a congressional charter under Title 36 of the United States Code on November 20, 1981.

Any American citizen who was honorably discharged or separated from the U.S. armed forces during the periods of war or conflict is eligible for membership. Posthumous membership may be given to those who have died in wartime and active duty membership may be given to those who remain in the military. Posts currently exist in Connecticut, Florida, Illinois, Massachusetts, New Jersey, New York, Ohio, Pennsylvania and Rhode Island. The National Ladies Auxiliary is the affiliate organization for women.

External links
 ITAMVETS website
Federal charter for Italian American War Veterans: hearing before the Committee on the Judiciary, United States Senate, Ninety-sixth Congress, second session, on S. 2542, November 20, 1980. 
Italian-American War Veterans of the United States : hearing before the Subcommittee on Administrative Law and Governmental Relations of the Committee on the Judiciary, House of Representatives, Ninety-seventh Congress, first session, on H.R. 33 ... June 11, 1981. 

American veterans' organizations
American people of Italian descent
Patriotic and national organizations chartered by the United States Congress